Lucy Gannon (born 1948) is a British playwright and television writer, and producer. She was the recipient of the 1989-90 Susan Smith Blackburn Prize.

Life
Lucy Gannon once worked as a military policewoman, a residential social worker, and a nurse, and lived in a concrete council house with no central heating.  She later moved to a converted barn in Derbyshire and now lives near Cardigan, in Wales.

She started, in 1987, to enter the Richard Burton Award for New Playwrights. Her play, Keeping Tom Nice, about a disabled boy whose father commits suicide, earned her the award and a six-month writer-in-residence at the Royal Shakespeare Company.  In 1988 Keeping Tom Nice was shown at the Almeida Theatre in London, and in 1989 shown as a BBC TV Screenplay starring Linus Roache.

Gannon has written several single or short run dramas, including Dad, Tender Loving Care, Trip Trap, The Gift, Big Cat, Pure Wickedness, The Best Of Men, The Children.

In 2008 Lucy Gannon criticised the BBC, saying that delays in commissioning programmes threaten writers and producers.

In 1996 she was awarded the MBE for services to Drama, and among her awards are The Eileen Anderson Award, The Richard Burton Drama Award, The Susan Smith Blackburn Award, The BAFTA Cymru, and the Contribution To The Media Award (Women in Film and Television) and, most recently, the RTS Award (South West England) for Best Writer for her film The Best Of Men.

In 2012 Gannon wrote the one-off BBC2 drama The Best of Men which told the story of the first Paralympic Games and starred Eddie Marsan and Rob Brydon. She is the lead writer and creator of the 2013 BBC One drama series Frankie.

Works

Plays
Broken Hearted, 2010

Tender Loving Care
Dancing Attendance, 1990
A Dog Barking, 1988
Janet And John, 1988
Raping The Gold, 1988
Wicked Old Nellie, 1987

Teleplays
The Best of Men (2012) TV Film
The Children (2008) TV mini-series (writer)
Wild at Heart (1 episode, 2007) (writer)
Dad (2005) (TV) (writer)
"Blue Dove" (2003) TV mini-series (creator) (writer)
"Servants" (2003) TV series (writer)
Plain Jane (2002) (TV) (writer)
"Hope & Glory (creator and writer, 1999-2000)
Pure Wickedness (1999) (TV) (writer)
Big Cat (1998) (TV) (writer)
The Gift (1998) (TV) (writer)
"Bramwell" (17 episodes, 1995–1998)
Trip Trap (1996) (TV) (writer)
"Peak Practice" (15 episodes, 1993–1994)
"Screen One" (1 episode, 1993)
"Soldier Soldier" TV series 1991-1997 (creator) (writer 11 episodes, 1991–1992)
A Small Dance (1991) (writer)
Testimony of a Child (1989) (TV) (screenplay)

References

External links

Lucy Gannon, doollee

1948 births
Living people
British dramatists and playwrights
British television producers
British women television producers
British television writers
British women television writers